Yajima (written: ,  or ) is a Japanese surname. Notable people with the surname include:

, Japanese voice actress
, Japanese educator
, Japanese footballer
, Japanese singer and idol
, Japanese sport shooter
, Japanese footballer
, Japanese water polo player
, Japanese footballer
, Japanese writer

Japanese-language surnames